The 1982 Sonoma State Cossacks football team represented Sonoma State University as an independent during the 1982 NCAA Division II football season. Led by first-year head coach Tony Kehl, Sonoma State compiled a record of 2–9. The team was outscored by its opponents 309 to 129 for the season. The Cossacks played home games at Cossacks Stadium in Rohnert Park, California.

Schedule

Notes

References

Sonoma State
Sonoma State Cossacks football seasons
Sonoma State Cossacks football